Neve Glacier is in North Cascades National Park in the U.S. state of Washington and is on the north slopes of Snowfield Peak.

See also
List of glaciers in the United States

Gallery

Notes

References
 

Glaciers of the North Cascades
Glaciers of Skagit County, Washington
Glaciers of Washington (state)